Buckeridge is a surname. Notable people with the surname include:

Anthony Buckeridge (1912–2004), English author
Charles Buckeridge (priest) (1756–1827), Archdeacon of Coventry (1816–1827)
Charles Buckeridge (c. 1832 – 1873), British architect
Charles Edgar Buckeridge (1864–1898), British church decorative artist
John Buckeridge (c. 1562 – 1631), English churchman
John H. Buckeridge (1857–1934), Australian architect
Len Buckeridge (1936–2014), Australian businessman

See also
Buckeridge Group of Companies